The Royal Belgian Athletics League (Dutch: Koninklijke Belgische Atletiekbond, French: Ligue Royale Belge d'Athlétisme) is the governing body for the sport of athletics in Belgium. 

It consists of the Flemish League of Athletics (Dutch: Vlaamse Atletiekliga) and the Francophone League of Athletics (French: Ligue Belge Francophone d'Atléthisme), cooperating for organising the national championships and for participation in international competitions.

Affiliations 
World Athletics
European Athletic Association (EAA)
Belgian Olympic and Interfederal Committee

See also
 Belgian men's 4 × 400 metres relay team

National records 
The Federation maintains the Belgian records in athletics.

External links 
Official webpage 

Belgium
Athletics
National governing bodies for athletics
Organisations based in Belgium with royal patronage